Gabriella Varga (born 7 April 1982) is a Hungarian foil fencer. On top of being an individual European champion in 2003 and a team European champion in 2007, Varga competed in the women's foil events at the 2004 and 2008 Summer Olympics.

References

External links
 
 

1982 births
Living people
Hungarian female foil fencers
Olympic fencers of Hungary
Fencers at the 2004 Summer Olympics
Fencers at the 2008 Summer Olympics
Martial artists from Budapest
21st-century Hungarian women